Lego Masters is an Australian reality television show based on the British series of the same name in which teams compete to build the best Lego project. It is hosted by Hamish Blake and judged by Lego designer Ryan "The Brickman" McNaught. The series premiered on 28 April 2019 on Nine Network.
 
The programme produced by Endemol Shine won a Realscreen award for Best Competition in 2020, beating out such game shows as Celebrity Family Feud, Hollywood Game Night and Deal or No Deal, and joining the Eureka Productions produced series Holey Moley as an Australian winning production in the US.

Production

Auditions for the series opened in June 2018, although no network had commissioned it at that time. Filming would take place between October and December. The series was commissioned in July 2018 by the Nine Network, and was officially confirmed at Nine's Upfronts in October 2018, which also announced that the series would be hosted by Hamish Blake.

The first season was sponsored by Lego, Honda, Kmart and The a2 Milk Company.

Due to the success of the series, in May 2019 the series was renewed for a second season, which was filmed in 2019 and aired in 2020. On 16 October 2019, the second season was officially confirmed at Nine's upfronts. The second season began airing on 19 April 2020. It finished airing on 18 May 2020.

The second season was sponsored by Lego, Honda, Kmart and Wonder Bread.

Auditions for the third season opened in May 2020, asking for applicants 15 years old and above. In early September 2020, it was confirmed the third season would begin filming on Monday, October 5 at Melbourne Showgrounds. On 16 September 2020, the third season was officially confirmed at Nine's 2021 upfronts. The third season began airing on 19 April 2021.

In April 2021, Nine Network renewed the series for a fourth and fifth season, with Hamish Blake set to return as host for both. In August 2021, it was announced series production would be moved from Melbourne to Sydney due to Covid border restrictions. The fourth season began airing on 18 April 2022. The series was filmed at Fox Studios Sydney.

In September 2022, the series was renewed by Nine for a fifth season which is set to be an “All-stars” season, to be titled Lego Masters: Grand Masters, which will have returning contestants from each previous season.

Series overview

Season details

Season 1 (2019)

The first season aired on 28 April 2019 and ended on 14 May 2019. The season was won by Henry and Cade, who received  $100,000 in prize money.

Season 2 (2020)

The second season began airing on 19 April 2020 and ended on 18 May 2020. The season was won by Jackson and Alex, who received  $100,000 in prize money.

Season 3 (2021)

The third season began airing on 19 April 2021 and ended on 17 May 2021. The season was won by David and Gus, who received $100,000 in prize money.

Season 4 (2022)

The fourth season began airing on 18 April 2022. The season was won by Joss and Henry, who received  $100,000 (plus $50 donated by Hamish) in prize money.

Viewership

Awards and nominations

Christmas specials

During Nine’s 2022 upfronts, it was announced that a two-part Christmas special would air in the fourth quarter of 2021. The series would have celebrities team up with contestants from the past seasons to create new Christmas themed builds, and the celebrities would include Scott Cam, Sophie Monk, Brooke Boney and Michael “Wippa” Wipfli. The special aired on 21 and 28 November 2021.

During Nine’s 2023 upfronts, it was announced that a second two-part Christmas special would air in the fourth quarter of 2022, and that the celebrities would include Poh Ling Yeow, Emma Watkins, Darren Palmer and Lincoln Lewis. The second special aired on 20 and 27 November 2022.

Notes
 * Not all teams in the season have an existing relationship (e.g. family or friend); some were paired together during the application process due to single applications.

References

Nine Network original programming
Australian television series based on British television series
2019 Australian television series debuts
2010s Australian reality television series
English-language television shows
Television series by Endemol Australia
Lego television series
2020s Australian reality television series
Reality competition television series